The 1943 Portsmouth North by-election was held on 16 February 1943.  The by-election was held due to the elevation to the peerage of the incumbent Conservative MP, Sir Roger Keyes.  It was won by the Conservative candidate William Milbourne James.

References

1943 in England
Elections in Portsmouth
1943 elections in the United Kingdom
By-elections to the Parliament of the United Kingdom in Hampshire constituencies
20th century in Hampshire